Louise Le Nay is an Australian actress and writer, known for her role as Sandy Edwards in Prisoner (1981–82), and Stella Stinson, Kim's adoptive mother in Lift Off (1992–95). Her novel, The Hero, was published in 1996.

Career
Le Nay played Sandy Edwards in Prisoner, in a role which spanned the end of 1981 and the beginning of 1982 on screen.  In the show, Sandy became Top Dog whilst Bea Smith was in hospital, and was a popular and key character. Whilst working on the series, she discovered that she was pregnant and eventually left to have her daughter, Victoria. She later acted with her daughter when she had a guest role in A Country Practice in 1983, playing a single mother.

At the end of 1985 Le Nay was appearing as Barbara Hill in the original run of Neighbours, when it was still  screened by Australia's Seven Network.  Although not a main character, she played a key role in the run up to what was intended to be the show's final episode (episode 171) as the new girlfriend of respectable villain Charles Durham who planned to kill the first wife of Paul Robinson, Terry.

Le Nay's novel, The Hero was published in 1996 by Allen & Unwin. She later moved into writing for television, writing scripts as well as progressing from a story liner to script editor for the popular series Neighbours during the time the show achieved its peak rating performance success when character Karl Kennedy was cheating on his wife with his receptionist. She also worked as a script editor on Blue Heelers and MDA.

Filmography

References

External links 

Australian film actresses
Australian soap opera actresses
Living people
20th-century Australian actresses
National Institute of Dramatic Art alumni
21st-century Australian women
21st-century Australian people
1957 births